D54 may refer to:
 D54 (protocol)
 a road in Dubai
 Greek destroyer Leon (D54), a Greek Navy destroyer
 INS Ranvir (D54), an Indian Navy destroyer
 D54 (Croatia), a state road in Croatia